Rüdiger Borchardt (born 8 December 1963) is a German handball player. He competed in the men's tournament at the 1988 Summer Olympics.

References

External links
 

1963 births
Living people
German male handball players
Olympic handball players of East Germany
Handball players at the 1988 Summer Olympics
People from Wismar
Sportspeople from Mecklenburg-Western Pomerania